Long Time Dead is a 2002 British horror film, co-written and directed by Marcus Adams in his directorial debut.

Set in the United Kingdom, the film follows a group of college students in which they experiment with an Ouija board and inadvertently summon a djinn, an Arabic spirit of fire, which puts their lives in danger.

The film stars Alec Newman, Marsha Thomason and Joe Absolom alongside Mel Raido, Lara Belmont, Melanie Gutteridge and Lukas Haas.

Premise
After a night of hard-partying, a group of college students decide to try their hands at a seance by using a homemade Ouija board. Things take a turn for the worse when they end up summoning a djinn that soon begins to hunt down and lead each one of the students towards untimely deaths.

To stop the djinn, Liam, desperate for the sake of his friends, will have to face his fear of the supernatural; even if it means paying the ultimate price.

Cast
 Alec Newman as Liam
 Marsha Thomason as Lucy
 Joe Absolom as Rob
 Lukas Haas as Webster
 James Hillier as Spencer
 Mel Raido as Joe
 Lara Belmont as Stella
 Melanie Gutteridge as Annie
 Tom Bell as Becker

References

External links 
 
 
 

2002 films
2002 horror films
2000s horror thriller films
British horror thriller films
English-language French films
Films scored by Don Davis (composer)
Films set in Morocco
Films set in England
French horror thriller films
Genies in film
StudioCanal films
Working Title Films films
2002 directorial debut films
2000s English-language films
2000s British films
2000s French films